was a Japanese zoologist. He is known for describing the Iriomote cat in 1967. He was the director of the zoological department of the National Museum of Nature and Science.

References

1914 births
2007 deaths
Japanese mammalogists
Japanese taxonomists
20th-century Japanese zoologists